The meridian 66° east of Greenwich is a line of longitude that extends from the North Pole across the Arctic Ocean, Europe, Asia, the Indian Ocean, the Southern Ocean, and Antarctica to the South Pole.

The 66th meridian east forms a great circle with the 114th meridian west.

From Pole to Pole
Starting at the North Pole and heading south to the South Pole, the 66th meridian east passes through:

{| class="wikitable plainrowheaders"
! scope="col" width="115" | Co-ordinates
! scope="col" | Country, territory or sea
! scope="col" | Notes
|-
| style="background:#b0e0e6;" | 
! scope="row" style="background:#b0e0e6;" | Arctic Ocean
| style="background:#b0e0e6;" | Passing just east of Graham Bell Island, Franz Josef Land, 
|-
| style="background:#b0e0e6;" | 
! scope="row" style="background:#b0e0e6;" | Barents Sea
| style="background:#b0e0e6;" |
|-
| 
! scope="row" | 
| Severny Island, Novaya Zemlya
|-
| style="background:#b0e0e6;" | 
! scope="row" style="background:#b0e0e6;" | Kara Sea
| style="background:#b0e0e6;" |
|-
| 
! scope="row" | 
|
|-
| 
! scope="row" | 
|
|-
| 
! scope="row" | 
|
|-
| 
! scope="row" | 
|
|-
| 
! scope="row" | 
|
|-
| 
! scope="row" | 
| Balochistan
|-
| style="background:#b0e0e6;" | 
! scope="row" style="background:#b0e0e6;" | Indian Ocean
| style="background:#b0e0e6;" |
|-
| style="background:#b0e0e6;" | 
! scope="row" style="background:#b0e0e6;" | Southern Ocean
| style="background:#b0e0e6;" |
|-
| 
! scope="row" | Antarctica
| Australian Antarctic Territory, claimed by 
|-
|}

See also
65th meridian east
67th meridian east

e066 meridian east